Commemoration Day, previously known as Martyrs' Day (Arabic: يوم الشهيد yawm ash-shahiid), is a national holiday in the United Arab Emirates recognising the sacrifices and dedication of Emirati martyrs who have given their life in the field of civil, military and humanitarian service. The day is marked annually on 30th of November, but observed with a public holiday on the 1st of December.
The observance and public holiday were both previously held on 30th of November (pre-2019).

History

The first Emirati policeman to die is Salem Suhail bin Khamis Al Dahmani on 30 November 1971, during the exploiting of Abu Musa and the Greater and Lesser Tunbs by Iranian forces shortly before the UAE’s formation. Al Dahmani led a six-member police force on Greater Tunb. The island was invaded by Iran on the eve of Federation. He refused to lower the flag of Ras Al Khaimah, and he was killed by the Iranian navy.

On 19 August 2015, the date of Al Dahmani's death was announced as Martyrs Day.

Martyrs timeline
The soldiers who fell during the First Gulf War (1990-1991) while liberating Kuwait will also be remembered along with martyrs such as Saif Ghubash, the government minister who was assassinated in 1977, and Khalifa Al Mubarak, an Emirati ambassador who was assassinated in 1984. Others who have died in the line of duty will always be honoured.

"Operation Restoring Hope" in Yemen
UAE armed forces joined "Operation Restoring Hope" under the Saudi Arabia-led Arab alliance in 2015 to support the Aden-based government recognized by the Gulf states. The number of UAE soldiers martyred in Yemen rose to 45. The UAE government announced a three-day mourning period from September 5, 2015, with flags to be flown at half-mast.

Observance
Commemorative and national ceremonies and events will be organised nationwide on December 1. All state institutions, nationals and non-nationals will be engaged to promote, mark and remember the values of sacrifice, dedication and loyalty, of the UAE citizens who sacrificed their lives in battles of heroism, dedication and national duty. The holiday will honour the heroes with nationwide remembrance to those who gave their souls for their homeland.

Tributes
Commemorating the UAE’s fallen heroes on November 30 every year from 2015 will be a tribute to UAE's heroes.

Wahat Al Karama, which is also known by its English translation Oasis of Dignity, is a war memorial and monument in Abu Dhabi, United Arab Emirates located across Sheikh Zayed Grand Mosque to commemorate all Emiratis who were killed in the line of duty. The memorial was unveiled on the United Arab Emirates Commemoration Day on 1 December 2016. The memorial is composed of three structures: the leaning pillars, the pavilion of honor, and the memorial plaza. The names of all Emirati soldiers who were killed in duty are inscribed in the pavilion of honor.

Sheikh Sultan bin Mohammed Al Qasimi, the Ruler of Sharjah, ordered that a square be dedicated in honour of the servicemen. Building of a monument is proposed to honour those who died in the line of duty is to be inaugurated on Martyrs’ Day. Sharjah will be installing a martyrs’ monument on Maliha Road, near the Sharjah Centre for Space and Astronomy, and a road in Sharjah University City will be renamed Martyr’s Road.

A martyrs’ square and memorial will be built in Al Alam Park in Ajman.

The road linking the emirates of Fujairah and Ras Al Khaimah, has been renamed as 'Martyrs Street' or 'Shuhada Street' in Arabic, in memory of the martyrs as a tribute.

References

UAE Commemoration Day 2018 to be marked on December 1 - Time Out Abu Dhabi

Public holidays in the United Arab Emirates
November observances
Recurring events established in 2015
Observances in the United Arab Emirates
Emirati nationalism
2015 establishments in the United Arab Emirates
Autumn events in the United Arab Emirates